Altynbek Sarsenbayuly (Altynbek Särsenbaiūly; 12 September 1962 – 11 February 2006) was a Kazakh politician who served in the Government of Kazakhstan before becoming a political opposition leader. At the time of his death, he served as co-chairman of the opposition Naghyz Ak Zhol (True Bright Path) party.

In 2003, after a long career in senior Kazakh government positions, such as Information Minister and Ambassador to Russia, Sarsenbayuly joined the opposition ranks in protest against what he regarded as the administration's authoritarian policies.

Soon after his decision to contest in the 2005 Kazakh presidential election, Sarsenbayuly faced government intimidation tactics, including a physical assault by unidentified individuals during a presidential campaign meeting with voters and the alleged beating of his two nephews in November 2005.

Biography

Early life and education 
Sarsenbayuly was born in the village of Qainar in family of 12 children. In 1982, he graduated from the Faculty of Journalism of the Al-Farabi Kazakh National University and then in 1985 from the Moscow State University.

Career 
From 1985, he was an editor and senior editor of KazTAG. In 1987, Sarsenbayuly became an editor and executive secretary of the Arai - Zarya magazine. From 1989 to 1992, he was an editor of the Orken - Horizon newspaper.

In March 1992, Sarsenbayuly was appointed as the head of the Department of Culture and Interethnic Relations of the President. From August 1992, he served as the head of the Department of Internal Policy of the President.

On 20 January 1993, Sarsenbayuly was appointed as Minister of Press and Media. While serving the post, he founded the Democratic Party of Kazakhstan on 1 July 1995 and was its co-chairman until it was merged with Otan on 1 March 1999. On 14 October 1995, the Ministry was reorganized into National Agency for Press and Mass Media of the Republic of Kazakhstan in 14 October 1995 where Sarsenbayuly served its chairman.

On 13 October 1997, Sarsenbayuly became the Minister of Information and Public Accord. On 22 January 1999, after the Ministry was merged, he was appointed as the Minister of Culture, Information and Public Accord until becoming the secretary of the Security Council of Kazakhstan on 5 May 2001. On 25 January 2002, Sarsenbayuly was appointed as an Ambassador of Kazakhstan to Russia until being relieved from his post on 3 November 2003.

In December 2003, Sarsenbayuly became the co-chair of the Ak Zhol Democratic Party. From 12 July to 29 September 2004, he was the Minister of Information before resigning from the post after accusing of the government rigging the 2004 legislative elections. After Ak Zhol was split on 19 April 2005, Sarsenbayuly was the organizer and co-chairman of the unregistered Naghyz Ak Zhol party.

Murder and investigation
On 13 February 2006 the bodies of Sarsenbayuly, his bodyguard and his driver were found dead on a road near the city of Almaty, reportedly lying face-down, hands tied on their back, and shot in the head at point blank range.

On 22 February 2006 five officers of Kazakhstan's KNB security service, and specifically the elite Arystan combat division, were arrested for involvement in Sarsenbayuly's murder. According to Interior Minister Bauyrzhan Mukhamedzhanov the five men were paid $25,000 for committing the murder. Nartay Dutbayev, the chief national security officer in the government, resigned on 23 February, the day after his subordinates were arrested.

Police arrested Rustam Ibragimov, a former law enforcement officer, as a suspect for organizing the operation. Four more men were later arrested in connection with the assassination.

On 31 August 2006, all ten of the accused assassins were convicted of the murder of Sarsenbaev. Rustam Ibragimov was sentenced to death, while his nine accomplices received prison terms ranging from 3–20 years. Ibragimov's death sentence was commuted to life in prison in 2014.

The completion of the investigation in December 2013 was marked by a press conference with the Deputy Prosecutor General of Kazakhstan and the ranking American diplomat in Kazakhstan, Ambassador John Ordway.

Ordway praised the "exceptional cooperation" between Kazakh law enforcement and the American Federal Bureau of Investigation, and that the FBI's results were consistent with the findings of the Kazakhstani Procurator General. Ordway emphasized that the FBI's investigation was independent from the Procurator General's office, and the FBI had full and immediate access all materials and information.

References

External links
 BBC News obituary
 BBC News: Kazakh officers linked to murder
 Kazakhstan: Freed Opposition Leader Returns To Almaty
 Kazakh Court Upholds Sarsenbaev Murder Convictions

1962 births
2006 deaths
Kazakhstani murder victims
Deaths by firearm in Kazakhstan
People murdered in Kazakhstan
Government ministers of Kazakhstan
Naghyz Ak Zhol politicians
Ak Zhol Democratic Party politicians
2006 crimes in Kazakhstan
2000s murders in Kazakhstan
2006 murders in Asia